Penney S. Azcarate is the chief judge of the circuit court in Fairfax County, Virginia. Azcarate presided over the defamation case brought by actor Johnny Depp against his ex-wife Amber Heard.

Life and career 
Azcarate served during the 1991 Persian Gulf War as a US Marine. After her service, she graduated from George Mason University School of Law at George Mason University in 1998 (renamed Antonin Scalia Law School in 2016).

In 2008, Azcarate was elected by the General Assembly to serve on Virginia's General District Court Bench. Her election was historic as she was the first woman to hold this position. While a judge, Azcarate observed a high number of veterans developing criminal records as a result of PTSD. In 2014, she introduced a plan to create a special veterans' treatment docket in Fairfax County, with the goal of preventing veterans from getting criminal records and instead getting the treatment they needed. As a result of Azcarate's efforts, by 2016, Fairfax County established a Veterans Treatment Docket in each of its three courts, General District, Juvenile and Domestic Relations and Circuit Court.

On February 25, 2015, Azcarate was elected by the Virginia General Assembly as the first female chief judge of the 19th Judicial Circuit in Virginia, and took office on July 1. Azcarate's predecessor, chief judge Bruce D. White, handled early, pre-trial issues related to the Depp v. Heard case.

References 

Living people
Virginia circuit court judges
People from Fairfax County, Virginia
United States Marine Corps personnel of the Gulf War
George Mason University alumni
21st-century American judges
Year of birth missing (living people)
21st-century American women judges